VoIP User was a community-driven and financed SIP based VoIP network. The projects aim is to introduce people to the concept of VoIP by allowing members to experiment with SIP and IAX2 devices

Voice over Internet Protocol (VoIP), is a technology that allows you to make voice calls using a broadband Internet connection instead of a regular (or analog) phone line.

Features 
The VoIP User network was designed to operate within a community environment and therefore differs substantially from most other VoIP networks. The main highlighted difference being that users can call PSTN phone numbers through VoIP User's PSTN gateway without incurring any call charges. The way that VoIP User is funded is noteworthy: Calls into VoIP User’s numbers generate a small amount of per minute revenue (the “termination charge”), and this money goes into a community account or “pot”. Outbound calls from VoIP User then call upon this pot and use the accrued call minutes. This means that if all users are community-minded then there is a balance between incoming and outgoing calls that keeps the pot at a constant level.

There is a cap on call routes (which may vary) meaning the VoIP User PSTN gateway will only route calls to any country which can be achieved for 2.5p/min (pence a minute) or less. This is mostly landlines, but does include some mobile phones. A full country list is available, as is a fair use policy. The maximum allowed call time per call is currently 10 minutes.

The cost of calls to different countries/cities is determined according to rate tables that come from VoIP User’s own PSTN line provider(s), so costs vary over time as they do for fully commercial international Telcos. Such variations are affected by changes in international currency exchange rates, commercial negotiations between large international carriers and commercial policies. Where VoIP User varies from a commercial Telco, though, is that the intention is not to make large profits from connecting calls, but rather to broadly break even. This methodology is frequently referred to as "minute neutral".

Data on calls routed between the PSTN and the internet by the VoIP User network can be seen on their analytics page.

Members can obtain a UK non-geographic inbound phone number at no cost which can be routed to any landline throughout the world, or any SIP or IAX2 based VoIP device.

Web forum 
In addition to the telco features of VoIP User, it also has a web forum with RSS feeds and a telecom-focused news feed. There are many discussion forums on topics including VoIP, telephony, messaging, presence, open source and Web 2.0. The forum is visited by a large international community, including many industry innovators and telecom experts.

Staff and founders 
VoIP User was created by Dean Elwood and Tjardick van der Kraan in July 2003 and both are still intimately involved in the running of both network and web site. Both Dean and Tjardick are internationally known figures in the telecom and Web 2.0 world, and both are huge fans of gadgets and technology.

A small team of volunteers administer the forums and help maintain the VoIP network and imagining and creating new features for VoIP User. The forum community itself also contributes a lot to VoIP User, with many experienced developers, gurus and engineers offering help and advice to others with questions and problems.

Fraud 
As with any Telco that enables calls to be connected internationally, the problem of fraud does sometimes arise. Companies and individuals wanting to make a “quick buck” have sometimes tried to harness the VoIP User network in order to connect paying customers with what is, essentially, a free service, allowing margin to be skimmed off for the fraudster.

VoIP User handles this with a variety of measures, including the 10-minute call limit, and in extremis blocking of traffic to specific high fraud risk destinations altogether. Over the years VoIP User has seen many patterns of call fraud and has created tools and techniques to combat them based on the detection of those patterns.

Technology, protocols and architecture 
VoIP User currently supports Session Initiation Protocol (SIP) for both incoming and outgoing calls and IAX2 protocol for incoming calls. It also supports SIP SIMPLE for Instant Messaging and Presence.

Most of the VoIP User core network is constructed using industry-standard PC servers, running Linux and telephony applications that include Asterisk (for audio messaging media and echotesting services), OpenSER (for SIP proxy and registrar duties) and edge controllers and media gateways being a combination of open-source and custom written software. Call rating, CDR collection and account handling software is custom written and based on FreeRADIUS and the integration of RADIUS messaging to the media gateways and SIP B2BUAs residing at the network edge. VoIP User currently operates 9 servers hosted globally and with the main core and media gateways residing at Telehouse London.

A wide variety of customer equipment is used on the VoIP User network including desktop VoIP phones, softphones, mobile phones (using Fring on the Apple iPhone and Windows Mobile devices and in-built Wi-Fi functionality in Nokia E series), ATAs and open source switches and PBXes like FreeSWITCH and Asterisk. As VoIP User is a "Bring Your Own Device Network" best of breed solutions can be used by the end user. VoIP User enables these devices to be mapped to UK non-geographic numbers (typically 0844 or 0870) that have a per minute call rate low enough to fit in with VoIP User’s mode of operation. As an experimental network, several software vendors and private authors test their SIP devices using the VoIP User network. As of January 2009 there were over 250 SIP User-Agents known to VoIP User.

Recently, the iNum initiative was launched, creating a special +883 country code (dubbed "Earth Area Code") that is intended to route calls for free (on-net) or low cost (from PSTN) irrespective of geographic location of the caller and callee. VoIP User is one of the handful of organizations signed up to this from the outset, and a practical result of this is that each one of VoIP User’s accounts now has its own 15-digit iNum telephone number. In the initial wave, VoIP companies have implemented iNum, but it is imagined that ultimately commercial Telcos will route these calls too at local call rates.

Regulation 
VoIP User is a member of ITSPA, the self-regulating body for the VoIP industry. It complies with the UK number portability scheme so that users may take issued numbers to alternative providers.

Website unavailability 
The Voipuser website became unavailable in late 2011. A major data loss caused the website to become unavailable and despite a short notice promising a rebuild it eventually failed to resolve to a destination in November 2012. However, as of December 2012, existing SIP accounts at sip.voipuser.org are still operational.

As of March 2013 there is activity  on the site again.

References

External links 
 
 Status page
 Full country list
 Fair use policy
 Analytics page
 Dinstar

VoIP services